Trevor Langridge is a male British sport shooter.

Sport shooting career
He represented England and won a bronze medal in the 50 metres rifle three positions pairs with Chris Hector, at the 1994 Commonwealth Games in Victoria, British Columbia, Canada.

References

Living people
Year of birth missing (living people)
British male sport shooters
Commonwealth Games medallists in shooting
Commonwealth Games bronze medallists for England
Shooters at the 1994 Commonwealth Games
Medallists at the 1994 Commonwealth Games